JFT may refer to:
 Job File Table, a data structure in DOS-compatible operating systems
 Johnson–Forest Tendency, an American Trotskyist organization
 Jones Falls Trail, in Baltimore, Maryland, United States
 Mazda J engine